Yellow Springs is a historic village in West Pikeland Township in Chester County, Pennsylvania. It is located between Phoenixville and Downingtown. 

The community includes historic churches, established in the 1770s by German Reformed and Lutheran members.  The village is located at the western end of Yellow Springs Road, a spur from Pennsylvania Route 113 near Chester Springs.

External links

 Historic Yellow Springs
 Yellow Springs Farm

Unincorporated communities in Chester County, Pennsylvania
Unincorporated communities in Pennsylvania